Vasilios Bouzas (born 30 June 1993) is a Greek professional footballer who plays as a midfielder for Super League Greece 2 club Veria.

Club career
Bouzas started his career at the youth teams of Panionios and was promoted to the first team on 8 July 2011. In total, he played for four years with the Blue-Reds amassing a total of 32 caps, all playing in the centre midfielder position. He spent his last season under contract with Panionios on loan with Football League side Kallithea. He then moved to fellow 2nd tier outfit Panegialios in the summer of 2016, before joining Ergotelis, also in the Football League on 29 August 2017. His performances with Ergotelis impressed manager Takis Gonias, who requested club owner Maged Samy, to arrange for Bouzas' transfer to his Egyptian Premier League side Wafi Degla in the summer of 2018.

International career
Bouzas has represented Greece internationally with the U-19 and U-21 outfits.

Career statistics

References

External links
Insports profile 
Onsports.gr profile 

1993 births
Living people
Greece youth international footballers
Panionios F.C. players
Kallithea F.C. players
Panegialios F.C. players
Ergotelis F.C. players
Super League Greece players
Association football midfielders
Footballers from Athens
Greek footballers
Asteras Vlachioti F.C. players
Wadi Degla SC players